Harry Baker may refer to:

 Harry Baker (footballer, born 1990), English footballer
 Harry Baker (Australian footballer) (1907–1992), Australian footballer for Footscray
 Harry L. Baker Jr. (1912–1973), president of the Georgia Tech Research Corporation
 Harry Frederick Baker (1904–1986), Australian speedway motorcycle rider and aviator
 Harry Baker, inventor of the Chiffon cake
 Harry Baker, sound engineer for Our Gang
 Harry C. Baker, American entrepreneur
 Harry Baker (poet) (born 1992), British spoken word artist, author and poet
 Harry Daniel Baker (born 1937), Canadian politician

See also
Harold Baker (disambiguation)
Henry Baker (disambiguation)